Barbara White may refer to:

 Barbara M. White (1920–1984), American diplomat
 Barbara White (actress) (1923–2013), British actress